Brachychiton garrawayae is a small tree of the genus Brachychiton found on the Cape York peninsula.

Notes

References

garrawayae
Flora of Queensland
Malvales of Australia
Trees of Australia
Ornamental trees
Drought-tolerant trees
Plants described in 1989